Archinemapogon bacurianus is a moth of the family Tineidae. It found in Georgia (the Caucasus).

The wingspan is about 21 mm. The forewings are light ash grey with a chocolate brown pattern.

References

Moths described in 1962
Nemapogoninae
Taxa named by Aleksei Konstantinovich Zagulyaev